Since 1999, the World Health Organization (WHO) has issued annual recommendations for influenza vaccine formulations. One reformulation of the influenza vaccine is for the Northern Hemisphere, and the other is for the Southern Hemisphere. Both recommendations are trivalent, i.e. featuring three strains.

Since the 2012–13 season, the WHO recommendations have also included the formulation of an annual quadrivalent vaccine, featuring an additional B-strain.


Northern hemisphere recommended strains
The following is a list of WHO recommended strains for the Northern Hemisphere influenza season. Starting in the 2012–2013 season, the recommendation shifted from a trivalent influenza vaccine (TIV) containing three strains to a quadrivalent influenza vaccine (QIV) that contains both influenza B lineages.

Southern hemisphere recommended strains
The following is a list of WHO recommended strains for the southern hemisphere influenza season.

See also
 2009 flu pandemic vaccine

Notes

References

Influenza vaccine
Influenza vaccine
Influenza vaccines
Vaccine, Influenza
Influenza vaccine
Vaccines